The Anarchy Championship Wrestling (ACW) American Joshi Championship is a women's professional wrestling title in American independent promotion Anarchy Championship Wrestling (ACW). Portia Perez pinned Angel Blue in the finals of a six way elimination match to become the inaugural champion on August 23, 2009. The title is currently vacated.

Title history

Combined reigns

References

Women's professional wrestling championships
Regional professional wrestling championships